Raymond Township, Illinois may refer to one of the following townships:

 Raymond Township, Champaign County, Illinois
 Raymond Township, Montgomery County, Illinois

See also

Raymond Township (disambiguation)

Illinois township disambiguation pages